Frank Howe may refer to:

 Frank E. Howe (1870–1956), Vermont newspaperman and politician
 Frank M. Howe (1849–1909), architect in Kansas City, Missouri and Boston, Massachusetts